John of Aragon may refer to:

John of Aragon (patriarch) (1304–1334), Latin patriarch of Alexandria
John I of Aragon (1350–1396), king of Aragon (from 1387)
John II of Aragon (1398–1479), king of Aragon (from 1458) and Navarre (from 1425)
Juan de Aragón (archbishop) (d. 1475)
John, Prince of Asturias (1478–1497), Aragonese infante and heir apparent